Kvinnherad Church is a parish church of the Church of Norway in Kvinnherad Municipality in Vestland county, Norway. It is located in the village of Rosendal. It is the church for the Rosendal parish which is part of the Sunnhordland prosti (deanery) in the Diocese of Bjørgvin. The white, stone church was built in a long church design in the mid-1200s using plans drawn up by an unknown architect. The church seats about 380 people.

History
The earliest existing historical records of the church date back to the year 1306, but it was not new at that time. The first church at Kvinnherad, was possibly a wooden post church that was built in the 12th century. During the middle to late 13th century, the wooden church was torn down and a new stone church was built to replace it. In 1678, the church became part of the newly established Barony Rosendal, where many of the Rosenkrantz family are buried.

In 1814, this church served as an election church. Together with more than 300 other parish churches across Norway, it was a polling station for elections to the 1814 Norwegian Constituent Assembly which wrote the Constitution of Norway. This was Norway's first national elections. Each church parish was a constituency that elected people called "electors" who later met together in each county to elect the representatives for the assembly that was to meet in Eidsvoll later that year.

In 1910, the church was sold to the municipality. The building has been renovated and refurbished many times over the centuries, the most recent times were in 1913-1914 and in 1955.

Media gallery

See also
List of churches in Bjørgvin

References

Kvinnherad
Churches in Vestland
Long churches in Norway
Stone churches in Norway
13th-century churches in Norway
Churches completed in the 1270s
12th-century establishments in Norway
Norwegian election church